Lieutenant General Luan Hoxha (born 28 March 1960 in Shkodër, Albania) was the Chief of General Staff of the Armed Forces of Albania until 16 June 2008. He was dismissed by the Albanian President after Prime Minister Berisha's proposal.

He is married and has two children. Besides his native language, he is fluent in English and Russian.

Military career
Luan Hoxha became Chief of General Staff of Albanian Armed Forces in 2006 after serving as the Deputy Chief of General Staff of the Albanian Armed Forces for three years, beginning in 2003.

Rank & Name            Lieutenant General Luan Hoxha

Position Chief of Albanian General Staff

Military Career

 Platoon Commander                                                                        1983-1985
 Company Commander                                                                        1985-1987
 Engineering Chief, Infantry Brigade                                                      1987
 Battalion Commander                                                                      1987-1991
 Director of Engineering Directorate at MoD                                                   1993
 Commander of the Land Forces Academy                                                     1993-1995
 Commander of the ”SKENDERBEJ“ Military Academy                                           1995-1997
 Chief of Counselors and Military Advisor of Ministry of Defence                              2000
 Director of Human Resources Department at MoD                                            2000
 Director of External Relations Directorate                                                   2001-2002 
 Director of Defense Policy and Integration Directorate                                       2002-2003
 Deputy Chief of General Staff of the Albanian Armed Forces                           2003

Education

 Armed Forces Academy, Tirana                                                         1980-1983
 “Spiro MOISIU” Defense Academy, Tirana                                               1991-1993
 Defence College, Tirana                                                              1995
 Royal College of Armed Sciences, UK                                                  2000-2001

Qualifications

 European Training Course, Geneva Center for Security, Switzerland                1997
 Senior Executive Course, George C. Marshall European Center for Security Studies Germany                                                                                    2000
 General & Flag Officers Course, NATO Def. College, Italy                     2002
 Operational Leadership Course, Norfolk, United States                                      2002
 Defense Management Course, United States                                                       2006
 Master of Science in Defence Diplomacy                                                   2006
 Royal Military College of Science                                                        2006

Awards
Military Service III Class Medal
National Service Medal
Recognition Medal
Medal for Exceptional Service in the General Staff of the Albanian Armed Forces
Career Medal

See also
 Albanian Armed Forces
 Albanian Air Force
 Albanian Naval Defense Forces
 Albanian Joint Forces Command
 Albanian Support Command

References

20th-century Albanian military personnel
21st-century Albanian military personnel
1960 births
Living people
Albanian generals
People from Shkodër